Allium griffithianum is a species of flowering plant in the Amaryllidaceae family. It is an onion found in the high mountains of Pakistan, Afghanistan, Kyrgyzstan, Uzbekistan and Tajikistan. It is a perennial herb up to 40 cm tall, with a hemispherical umbel of flowers, white or light pink or pale purple.

References

griffithianum
Onions
Flora of temperate Asia
Flora of Pakistan
Plants described in 1859
Taxa named by Pierre Edmond Boissier